Ligyrocoris is a genus of dirt-colored seed bugs in the family Rhyparochromidae. There are about 14 described species in Ligyrocoris.

Species
These 14 species belong to the genus Ligyrocoris:

References

Further reading

External links

 

Lygaeoidea